Zigmantas Balčytis (born 16 November 1953 in Šilutė district municipality) is a Lithuanian politician who briefly served as acting Prime Minister of Lithuania in 2006. He took office on 1 June 2006 following the resignation of Algirdas Brazauskas, but failed to be approved by the Parliament to become Prime Minister. He was succeeded on 4 July by Gediminas Kirkilas. Balčytis was a member of the Social Democratic Party of Lithuania until 2021 and was Minister of Finance in the Brazauskas government from 2005 to 2007.

On 19 October 2021, Balčytis left the SDLP and joined the newly formed party .

References

 . Zigmantas BALČYTIS. European Parliament.

|-

1953 births
Living people
People from Šilutė District Municipality
Lithuanian communists
MEPs for Lithuania 2009–2014
Ministers of Finance of Lithuania
Ministers of Transport and Communications of Lithuania
Prime Ministers of Lithuania
Social Democratic Party of Lithuania MEPs
Social Democratic Party of Lithuania politicians
Academic staff of Vilnius Gediminas Technical University
MEPs for Lithuania 2014–2019
Politicians from Vilnius
Members of the Seimas